A number of memorials have been established to honour people who served in the Korean War (25 June 1950 – 27 July 1953) including :

Australia 
 Korean War Memorial, Canberra
 ANZAC Square, Brisbane
 Beaudesert War Memorial
 Cairns War Memorial
 Esk War Memorial
 Gair Park
 Gympie Memorial Park
 Howard War Memorial
 Oxley War Memorial
 Queensland Korean War Memorial
 Sandgate War Memorial Park
 St Andrew's Presbyterian Memorial Church, Innisfail
 Stanthorpe Soldiers Memorial
 Strathpine Honour Board
 Toogoolawah War Memorial
 Warwick War Memorial
 Yeppoon War Memorial

Belgium 
Korean War Memorial, Sint-Pieters-Woluwe, Brussels

Canada 
Korean War Memorial Wall, Brampton, Ontario
Trenton Cenotaph, Trenton, Ontario

North Korea 

North Korea Peace Museum, Panmunjeom

South Korea 
Cemetery for North Korean and Chinese Soldiers, Jajang-Ro, Papyeong-myeon, Paju
Daejeon National Cemetery, Yuseong-gu, Daejeon
Dabudong War Memorial Museum, Chilgok-gun Gyeongsangbuk-do
Gapyeong Canada Monument, Gapyeong County
Gloucester Valley Battle Monument, Jeokseong-myeon, Paju City, Gyeonggi-do
Imjingak Memorial Park, Munsan-eup, Paju-si, Gyeonggi-do
Second Infantry Division Memorial
187th Airborne "Rakkasans" Memorial
Chamorros of Guam Memorial
Japanese American Korean War Veterans Memorial
Monument to US Forces in the Korean War Memorial
Incheon Landing Operation Memorial Hall, Ongnyeon-dong, Yeonsu-gu, Incheon
Seoul National Cemetery, Dongjak-gu, Seoul
United Nations Memorial Cemetery, Nam District, Busan
War Memorial of Korea, Yongsan-dong, Seoul

United Kingdom 
Korean War Memorial, London
Scottish Korean War Memorial, Beecraigs Country Park, Torpichen, West Lothian

United States 
Memorials
Korean War Veterans Memorial, Washington, D.C.
Massachusetts Korean War Veterans Memorial, Charlestown Naval Shipyard, Charlestown, Massachusetts
South Boston Korean War Memorial, Castle Island, South Boston, Massachusetts
Korean War Veterans Memorial (Austin, Texas)
Philadelphia Korean War Memorial, Penn's Landing, Society Hill
Pittsburgh Korean War Memorial, North Shore Riverfront Park
New Jersey Korean War Veterans Memorial, Atlantic City
Korean War Veterans Memorial (Jersey City)
California Korean War Veterans Memorial, San Joaquin Valley National Cemetery
San Francisco Korean War Memorial, Presidio
Korean War Memorial (Salem, Oregon)
Korean War Memorial, Nashville, Tennessee
Oregon Korean War Memorial, Wilsonville
Korean War Memorial, Olympia, Washington
Wisconsin Korean War Veterans Memorial, Plover, Wisconsin
Hawaii's Korean War Memorial, Hawaii State Capitol, Honolulu, Hawaii
Roadways dedicated as a Korean War Veterans Memorial Highway or Parkway
Korean War Veterans Parkway, Staten Island, New York (formerly, the Richmond Parkway)
New York State Route 59 (part)
Delaware Route 1 (toll portion)
Interstate 5 in Oregon
Interstate 70, Frederick County, Maryland
Bridges dedicated as a Korean War Veterans Memorial Bridge
Korean War Veterans Memorial Bridge, Nashville, Tennessee
Miscellaneous
Museum of History in Granite, Felicity, California
Chamorros Korean War Memorial, Hagåtña, Guam

See also
List of Union Civil War monuments and memorials
List of Confederate monuments and memorials

External links
 Korean War Memorials in Pictures
 Korean War Memorials

References

List
Memorials
Korean War